The Tagant Plateau is located in eastern Mauritania, forming a stony part of the Sahara Desert. The Tagant Region, a national administrative division, is named after the plateau.

Geography
Some towns are located at the foot of the Tagant Plateau's slopes, which form cliffs in some places. Among these areas are Tichit, Moudjéria and Rachid. Tidjikdja lies on the Tagant itself. The Assaba Massif, where Late Ordovician glacial formations have been identified, is a southward prolongation of the Tagant plateau. The Aoukar, the dry basin of a former lake lies beyond of the southern escarpments of the Tagant Plateau.

History
Beginning in mid-17th century, migrants from the Adrar Plateau region moved in and displaced the native population of the Tagant Plateau.

The Tartega Gueltas oasis is one of the few wetlands in the region where there were still desert crocodiles in 1976, but the population seems to have been last seen in 1996.

See also
Dhar Tichitt
Geography of Mauritania

References

External links
1.3 Mauritania - Ramsar Sites Information Service

Landforms of Mauritania
Plateaus of Africa
Natural regions of Africa